Gavkhos (also Romanized as Gāvkhos; also known as Gavaz, Gāvkhosb, Gāwaz, and Jāvaz) is a village in Darram Rural District, in the Central District of Tarom County, Zanjan Province, Iran. At the 2006 census, its population was 155, in 41 families.

References 

Populated places in Tarom County